Gowhar or Guhar may refer to:
 Gowhar, Razavi Khorasan
 Gowhar, Sistan and Baluchestan
 Gowhar, Zanjan